Diplocoelus rudis is a species of false skin beetle in the family Biphyllidae. It is found in North America.

References

Further reading

 

Biphyllidae
Articles created by Qbugbot
Beetles described in 1863